Altamira Municipality may refer to:
Altamira, Huila, a town and municipality in the Huila Department of Colombia
Altamira, Tamaulipas,  a municipality in the Mexican state of Tamaulipas

Municipality name disambiguation pages